Isanthrene pentagona is a moth of the subfamily Arctiinae. It was described by William Schaus in 1898. It is found in Peru.

References

Euchromiina
Moths described in 1898